Sunbury was a provincial electoral district for the Legislative Assembly of New Brunswick, Canada.  This riding was created in the 1973 redistribution when New Brunswick moved to single member districts from Bloc voting. Prior to 1973, two members were elected to represent Sunbury County. The other seat was assigned to the new electoral district of Oromocto.

In the 1994 redistribution, this district was redistributed into the new ridings of Grand Lake and New Maryland.

Members of the Legislative Assembly

Election results

External links 
Website of the Legislative Assembly of New Brunswick

Former provincial electoral districts of New Brunswick